The following have served as Master of Sidney Sussex College, Cambridge:

1596 James Montagu
1608 Francis Aldrich
1610 Samuel Ward
1643 Richard Minshull
1687 Joshua Basset
1688 James Johnson
1704 Bardsey Fisher
1723 Joseph Craven
1728 John Frankland
1730 John Adams
1746 Francis Sawyer Parris
1760 William Elliston
1807 Francis John Hyde Wollaston
1808 Edward Pearson
1811 John Davie
1813 William Chafy
1843 Robert Phelps
1890 Charles Smith
1918 George Weekes
1945 Thomas Knox-Shaw
1957 David Thomson
1970 John Wilfrid Linnett
1975 Donald Henry Northcote
1992 Gabriel Horn
1999 Sandra Dawson
2009 Andrew Wallace-Hadrill
2013 Richard Penty

References

Sidney Sussex